"Damn (Should've Treated U Right)" is the title of a pop/R&B single by So Plush featuring Ja Rule. The single spent 18 weeks on the US R&B singles chart in 1999.

Chart positions

References

1999 singles
Ja Rule songs
1999 songs
Epic Records singles
Songs written by Ja Rule
Songs written by LaShawn Daniels
Songs written by Fred Jerkins III
Songs written by Rodney Jerkins